KATA (1340 kHz) is an AM radio station broadcasting a sports format.  Licensed to Arcata, California, United States, the station is currently owned by Bicoastal Media Licenses II, LLC.

References

External links

ATA
Mass media in Humboldt County, California
Radio stations established in 1957
ESPN Radio stations